Oedura argentea is a species of velvet gecko (Diplodactylidae: Oedura) that has been recently described from the sandstone ranges of central-north Queensland, Australia.

References

Reptiles described in 2018
Taxa named by Conrad J. Hoskin
Taxa named by Stephen M. Zozaya
Taxa named by Eric P. Vanderduys
Reptiles of Queensland
Oedura